Royal warrants of appointment have been issued for centuries to tradespeople who supply goods or services to a royal court or certain royal personages. The royal warrant enables the supplier to advertise the fact that they supply to the issuer of the royal warrant; thus lending prestige to the supplier. Royal families of the United Kingdom, the Netherlands, Belgium, Luxembourg, Monaco, Denmark, Sweden, and Japan among others, allow tradesmen to advertise royal patronage.

Suppliers having a royal warrant charge for the goods and services supplied; a royal warrant does not imply that suppliers provide goods or services free of charge. Royal warrants are typically advertised on company hoardings, letter-heads and products by displaying the coat of arms or the heraldic badge of the royal personage issuing the royal warrant. Warrants granted by members of the British royal family usually include the phrase "By Appointment to…" followed by the title and name of the royal customer, and then what goods are provided; no other details of what is supplied may be given.

Purveyors for current households

Australia 
Royal warrant holders of the Court of Australia:

 Hardy Brothers

Belgium 

In Belgium the title of 'Purveyor to the Court' (Gebrevetteerd Hofleverancier van België/Fournisseur breveté de la Cour de Belgique) is granted to businesses who provide services or goods to the royal court. 
The list of 'purveyors to the Court' is updated every year. The king himself makes the decision who gets a title or not.

Some of the 'Purveyors to the Court' include:

 Armani
 BMW Belgium Luxembourg
 Mercedes-Benz Belgium Luxembourg
 Brussels Airlines
 Neuhaus
 Leonidas
 Godiva
 Jules Destrooper
 Delvaux
 Natan Couture

Denmark 
Purveyors to the Royal Danish Court:

Japan 

Purveyors to the Imperial Household Ministry; after World War II, the permission system was abolished, but purveyors still exist today:

 Miyamoto Shoko – silverware
 Gekkeikan – sake
 Kikkoman – soy sauce
 Nissin Foods – food
 Toraya Confectionery – wagashi
 Toyota – motor vehicles
 Manyoken – catering
 Yamada Heiando – lacquerware
 Koransha – ceramic ware
 Kuni – perfume
 Otsuka Shoe – shoes
 Onshino Tabako - tobacco
 Onshino Konpeitō - konpeitō sweets

Monaco 
High Patronage of the Monaco Royal Family:

 Chocolaterie de Monaco – chocolates
 British Theatre Season, Monaco – theatre
 Lexus – automobiles

Netherlands 

In the Netherlands, the status hofleverancier is awarded to small and medium-sized businesses that have existed for at least 100 years which have a good reputation regionally. However, the companies need not actually supply goods to the court. At present there are at least 387 companies that hold this status, which can be renewed every 25 years. Companies designated as hofleverancier are further permitted to display a plaque on their premises attesting to their status.

In addition, certain companies are granted the use of the designation koninklijke ("royal" in Dutch). These companies are also allowed to incorporate a crown in their logo. Examples include:

 KLM Royal Dutch Airlines
 KPN
 Royal Delft
 Royal Dutch Shell
 Royal Philips Electronics
 Royal Vopak
 Royal Dutch Football Association

Norway 
Purveyors to the Royal Court of the Norway: the status 'purveyor to the court' (hofflevrandør) is no longer awarded. 

Karl August Anderson – photographer (Kongl. Hoffotograf)
Farris –  mineral water
Foss Bryggeri – Brewery (H.VII Eneberettiget)
Hans H. Holm – Felt hats
King Oscar – Sea food 
H. C. Reiersen – Tailor (Kongl. Hoffskredder)
Christian Rohde & Søn – Tailor (Kngl. Norske slotts hoffleverandør)
M. Selmer –  photographer (Kongl. Hoffotograf)
O. Sørensen Vogn- og Karosserifabrikk  –  Automobil
L. Szaciński –  photographer (Kongl. Hoffotograf)

Romania 
Purveyors to the Romanian Royal House:

 BMW
 Farina gegenüber – eau de Cologne to Carol I (1881)
 Steinway & Sons – pianos
 M. Welte & Söhne – orchestrions, reproducing pianos (1894, 1910)
 Murfatlar SA – wines to Michael (2003)
 Frottirex – bath towels and bedding to Michael (2005)
 Doina Levintza – clothing and accessories to Michael (2005)
 Dan Coma – clothing and accessories to Michael (2005)
 Halewood International – Rhein extra sparkling wines to Michael (2006)
 SC Transavia SA – chicken meat to Michael (2005)
 Principal Company SA – Salonta sausage products to Michael (2007)
 Biborţeni – mineral water to Michael (2008)
 Exotique Romania – Exotic furniture and decorative items (2009)
 Carol Parc Hotel – Hotelier and catering services (2011)
 RUE DU PAIN – Boulangerie Artisanale – bakery, pastry and confectionery products (2011)
 BRIDGE PRINTING GROUP - Printing Company, Offset lithography, Hot-foil stamping, Embossing, and special finishings (2013)

Spain

Sweden

Thailand

Uganda 
The Royal House of Bunyoro-Kitara awards royal warrants to businesses that deliver goods and services to the royal house on a regular basis. The royal warrant can be awarded by a grantor, either the King, the Queen or the Crown Prince. The Board of the Royal Warrant Holder Society advises the Grantors but each Grantor makes the final decision to grant a Warrant. A business may only receive one Warrant from a Grantor. The warrants of the Bunyoro-Kitara Kingdom are valid for one year.

United Kingdom

Historical reigning households

Austria-Hungary 

 Augarten porcelain – porcelain and china
 J. A. Baczewski – vodka
 Bakalowits – crystal chandeliers
 Matthäus Bauer – accordions
 Jan Becher – herbal bitter
 Lucas Bols – liqueurs
 Ignaz Bösendorfer – pianos
 Carl Suchy & Söhne - watches
 Christofle – silverware
 Courvoisier – cognac
 Demel – chocolate and confectionery
 Farina gegenüber – eau de Cologne to Franz Joseph I (1872)
 E. Fessler – ovens
 Móric Fischer de Farkasházy, owner of Herend Porcelain Manufactory – porcelain
 Café Gerbeaud – cakes and pastries
 Gräf & Stift – carriages
 Hancocks & Co – jewelry
 L. & C. Hardtmuth – ovens and pencils
 Antoni Hawełka – catering
 J. A. Henckels – knives
 Hotel Imperial – catering
 Liebig's Extract of Meat Company – processed meats
 J. & L. Lobmeyr – crystal and glassware
 Löblich & Co. – heating
 Lohner-Werke – carriages
 Girolamo Luxardo – apéritif and digestif
 Rémy Martin – champagne
 Moët et Chandon – champagne
 Moser – glass and crystal
 Ferdinand Mülhens, owner of the 4711 (brand) – perfume
 G. H. Mumm – champagne
 A. Obholzer Kürschnerei – furs
 Paulaner Brewery – beer
 Pauly Beds / J. Pauly & Sohn – beds and mattresses
 Peek Freans – cookies
 Pilsner Urquell – beer
 Rieger Orgelbau – organs
 Louis Roederer – champagne
 Royal Worcester – porcelain
 Eduard Sacher, owner of the Hotel Sacher – cakes and pastries
 Robert Schlumberger von Goldeck – sparkling wine
 Schweighofer – pianos
 Adolf Steiner - pianos
 William Steinway – pianos
 Baron Raimund von Stillfried – photos
 Gebrüder Thonet – furniture
 Michael Thonet – furniture
 Charles Lewis Tiffany – jewelry and silverware
 Törley – sparkling wine
 Underberg – digestif bitter
 John Thomas Underwood – typewriters
 Veuve Clicquot – champagne
 Nathaniel Wheeler – sewing machines
 Wilhelm J. Sluka – cakes and pastries
 Zwack – herbal liquors

Bavaria 
Purveyors to the Court of Bavaria:

See Liste bayerischer Hoflieferanten .

 FA Ackermanns Kunstverlag – art publishing (1879)
 Eilles – coffee and tea (1873)
 Farina gegenüber – eau de Cologne to Ludwig II (1872)
 Fr. Ant. Prantl – printing and leather goods (1797)

Brazil 
Purveyors to the Brazilian Imperial Family:

 Casa Granado – chemists/pharmacists and toiletries
 Henry Poole & Co – tailors to Pedro II (1874)

France 
Purveyors to the Court of France:

 Moutard – printer and bookseller to Marie Antoinette, to Princess Marie Joséphine of Savoy, and to Princess Maria Theresa of Savoy (1770)
 Marc-Etienne Janety – master goldsmith and jeweler to Louis XVI (1777)
 Adam Weisweiler – cabinet maker to Louis XVI (1778)
  – perfumer to Marie Antoinette (1779)
 Farina gegenüber – eau de Cologne to Napoleon I (1811) and to Napoleon III (1867)
 Debauve & Gallais – chocolates to Louis XVIII (1819)
 Champagne Delbeck – champagne to Louis Philippe I (1838)
 Guerlain – eau de Cologne to Napoleon III (1868)

Italy 
Purveyors to the Italian Royal Family:

 Acqua di Biella – eau de Cologne to Umberto I (1878)
 Ballarino Gioielli (Cavour) – jewellery to S.A.R. the Prince Amedeo of Savoy, patent n° 01/07
 Baratti & Milano (Turin) – sweets
 Bianchi – cars
 Caffarel (Turin) – chocolate
 Caraceni (Milan) – clothes
 Fratelli Carli (Imperia) – olive oil
 Farina Gegenüber – eau de Cologne to King Vittorio Emanuele II (1876)
 Florio (Marsala) – wine
 Gancia – wine
 Gentilini (Roma) – food (biscuits)
 Marinella (Naples) – ties
 Martini & Rossi – liquor
 Musy, Padre & Figli (Turin) – jewellery
 Pagani (Parma) – sweets
 Pernigotti – chocolate
 Petochi (Rome) – jewellery
 Prada (Milan) – leather goods, trunks and clothes
 Saiwa – food (biscuits)
 Sperlari – food (biscuits)
 Steinway & Sons – pianos
 Luigi Borrelli (Naples) – clothing

Ottoman Empire 
Purveyors to the sultans of the Ottoman Empire:

 M. Welte & Söhne, orchestrions (1896)
 Abdullah Frères, photographers (1863)

Portugal 
Purveyors to the Portuguese Royal Household:
 Ballarino Gioielli (Cavour, Italy) – jewellery (honorary title granted by S.A.R. dom Pedro de Bragança e Bourbon)
 Farina Gegenüber – eau de Cologne to Luís I (1866)
 Confeitaria Nacional – confectionary to Luís I, Carlos I, Manuel II (1873-1910)

Prussia 
Purveyors to the Court of Prussia:

See Liste preußischer Hoflieferanten .

 Farina gegenüber – eau de Cologne to Friedrich Wilhelm IV (1841), Wilhelm I (1871), to Friedrich III (1888) and to Wilhelm II (1888)

Russia 

In the Russian Empire since 1856 there was the designation with the highest authorization "Supplier of His Imperial Majesty" with the state coat of arms on the shield. From 1895, at the request of Empress Alexandra Feodorovna, a second, additional authorization was granted: "Supplier of Her Imperial Majesty". Both authorizations existed until 1917, until the abdication of Nicholas II.

Purveyors to the Russian Imperial Family:

 Farina gegenüber – eau de Cologne to Nicholas I 1843
 Fabergé – jewellery to Nicholas II
 Smirnoff – vodka
 Cristal – champagne
 Steinway & Sons – pianos
 Gubanova Toiletries of Morshansk Russia appointed in 1763 with a Royal Warrant by Empress Catherine II to provide special cleaning and skincare products
 The Victoria Fine Soap Works, Minsk, Belarus – soap to Nicholas I and the Imperial family
  The Perfume Factory Partnership of Pharmacist A. M. Ostroumov - perfume, cologne, anti-dandruff soap and other medicinal cosmetics, 1900 - 1920

Yugoslavia 
Royal Warrant Holders of the Yugoslav Court:

 Sljeme (Zagreb) – trunks and leather goods, appointed in 1931

References

External links